The Ruahine Range is the largest of several mountain ranges in the North Island of New Zealand that form a ridge running parallel with the east coast of the island between East Cape and Wellington. The ridge is at its most pronounced from the central North Island down to Wellington, where it comprises the Ruahine, Tararua and Remutaka Ranges.

The Ruahines run northeast–southwest for 110 kilometres from inland Hawke's Bay to near Woodville. It is separated in the south from the northern end of the Tararua Range by the Manawatu Gorge.

The highest point in the Ruahines is Mangaweka, situated along the Hikurangi Range, which at 1733 metres (5686 feet) is the second highest non-volcanic mountainous peak in the North Island after Mt Hikurangi (1754 metres/5755 feet) in the Raukumara Range.

The other notable peak is Wharite (920 metres/3017 feet), which visually marks the southern end-point of the Ruahine Range. The dominant geographical landmark in the Manawatu and Tararua District, Wharite is perhaps better known in the region for its highly-visible television transmission tower. The first transmitter at Wharite was commissioned in 1963, relaying Wellington's WNTV1 channel (now part of TVNZ 1). The current main transmitter was commissioned in 1966.

Name
Ruahine is a Māori name believed to mean “wise woman”, with reference to the migrant leader's granddaughter on the Aotea canoe. A local Māori says "Kaua e whakakoria te kuku o Ruahine, kei wera!" (Don't disturb the forest of Ruahine, or it will burst into flames!), referring to the fact that attacking tribes often came down into Hawke's Bay through the passes of the Ruahine Range.

References

External links

Department of Conservation's section on the Western Ruahine Forest Park
Department of Conservation's section on the Eastern Ruahine Forest Park
 Close up image of Wharite peak (tramper.co.nz)
Tramping in Ruahine State Forest Park – A montage of photographs featuring the Hikurangi Range in full winter snow by Derek Watts – New Zealand Herald 2009

Mountain ranges of New Zealand
Landforms of the Hawke's Bay Region
Landforms of Manawatū-Whanganui
Rangitikei District
Central Hawke's Bay District
Manawatu District
Tararua District